Liqueurs are alcoholic beverages that are bottled with added sugar and have added flavours that are usually derived from fruits, herbs, or nuts. Liqueurs are distinct from eaux-de-vie, fruit brandy, and flavored liquors, which contain no added sugar. Most liqueurs range between 15% and 55% alcohol by volume.

Berry liqueurs
 99 Berries
 Chambord (raspberry)
 Crème de cassis (blackcurrant)
 Guavaberry
 Hideous (raspberries, other berries and citrus fruits)
 Lakka (cloudberry)
 Lillehammer (lingonberry)
 Mirto (Sardinian traditional bitterish liqueur made with myrtle, used as digestive drink at the end of meals)
 Murtado (ugniberry)
 XUXU (strawberry)
 Og natura Stone Bramble Liqueur (stone bramble)

Chocolate liqueurs

Coffee liqueurs

A coffee liqueur is a caffeinated alcoholic drink that consists of coffee and a shot of liqueur.

 Allen's Coffee Brandy
 Amaro 1716 Café du Soir
 Black Canyon Distillery,  Richardo's Decaf Coffee Liqueur
 Café Rica – a Costa Rican coffee liqueur
Caffè Borghetti - an Italian coffee liqueur
 Kahlúa – a Mexican coffee liqueur
 Kavalan Distillery Sweet coffee liqueur
 Kamora
 Liqueurious Coffea Coffee Liqueur 
 Liqueurious Coffea Decaf Coffee Liqueur 
Licor de café - a Galician coffee liqueur
 Midnight Espresso Regular Coffee Liqueur
 Midnight Espresso Decaf Coffee Liqueur
 Mr Black Cold Brew Coffee Liqueur
 Mr Black Cold Brew Coffee Amaro
 Patrón XO Cafe
 Sheridan's – an Irish coffee liqueur
 Sombai Anise & Coffee rice liqueur
 Flor de Caña Spresso – a Nicaraguan coffee liqueur
 San Andre (Goa)
 St. George Spirits NOLA Coffee Liqueur
 Tia Maria
 Toussaint Coffee Liqueur – a Haitian coffee liqueur
 B52 Coffee Liqueur

Cream liqueurs

 Advocaat
 Amarula (sugar, cream, and the fruit of the African marula tree Origin: South Africa)
 Baileys Irish Cream
 Coole Swan Irish Cream Liqueur
 Carolans
Crema Fina
 Cruzan Rum Cream
 Dooley's
 DV8 Gold
 DV8 Pink Gin
 Heather Cream (Scottish cream liqueur - discontinued)
 Kerrygold Irish Cream Liqueur
 Ponche crema
 Rompope
 RumChata
 Sangster's
 Saint Brendan's Irish Cream Liqueur
 Tequila Rose
 Vana Tallinn Cream
 Vermeer Dutch Chocolate Cream Liqueur
 Voodoo Cream Liqueur

Crème liqueurs

 Crème de banane – Banana
 Crème de cacao – Cocoa or chocolate
 Crème de cassis – Blackcurrant
 Crème de Cerise – Sour cherry
 Crème de menthe – Peppermint or Corsican mint
 Crème de Noyaux – Almond, apricot kernel, or peach kernel
 Creme de violette – Violet 
 Creme Yvette – Violet, fruit, and others
 Parfait d'Amour – Varies by maker, typically flowers with citrus

Flower liqueurs

 Crème de violette (violet)
 Creme Yvette (violet, vanilla)
 Rosolio (various)
 Italicus
 St-Germain (elderflower)

Fruit liqueurs

Note: Kirsch and Slivovitz are fruit brandies rather than liqueurs.

Herbal liqueurs
Note: the exact recipes of many herbal liqueurs (which may contain 50 or more different herbs) are often closely guarded trade secrets. The primary herbal ingredients are listed where known.

Anise-flavored liqueurs

Note: Absinthe, Arak, Rakı, Ouzo and similar anise-flavored beverages contain no sugar and thus are flavored liquors rather than liqueurs.
 Anís (Spain, Argentina, Perú)
 Licor Aniz Escarchado, (Portugal)
 Anisette (France)
 Centerbe (Italy; infusion of 100 high mountain herbs)
 Galliano (Italy)
 Herbsaint (United States)
 Passione Nera (Italy)
 Pastis (France)
 Patxaran (Spain)
 Ricard (France)
 Sambuca (Italy)
 Sombai Anise & Coffee (Cambodia)
 Vespetrò (Italy)
 Xtabentún (Mexico)
See also :Category:Anise liqueurs and spirits

Other herbal liqueurs

Honey liqueurs

 Rakomelo
 Bärenjäger
 Boilo
 Krupnik
 Xtabentún
 Yukon Jack

Nut-flavored liqueurs
Amaretto (almonds, or the almond-like kernels from apricots, peaches, cherries, or similar stone fruits)
Disaronno (apricot kernel oil)
Frangelico (hazelnuts and herbs)
Kahana Royale - a macadamia nut liqueur produced in Hawaii
Nocello (walnut and hazelnut)
Nocino (unripe green walnuts)
Orahovac – a walnut liqueur prepared using unripe green walnuts
Peanut liqueur
Peanut Lolita (peanut)
 Pochteca Almond Liqueur
Ratafia (brandy flavored with almonds, fruit, or fruit kernels; also a flavored biscuit)
Rivulet – a pecan liqueur produced in Kentucky, United States

Whisky liqueurs

Other liqueurs

See also

 List of alcoholic beverages
 List of cocktails
 List of national liquors
 List of whisky brands
 List of vodkas

Notes

References

Liqueurs
Liqueurs